Forty Thieves  is a 1944 American Western film starring William Boyd in the lead role of Hopalong Cassidy. It was directed by Lesley Selander, produced by Harry Sherman and released by United Artists. This was the last Hopalong Cassidy film that producer Harry Sherman produced for United Artists.

Plot summary
Hoppy runs for sheriff, but loses to Jerry Doyle (Kirk Alyn) when every crook in town votes for Doyle. When Hoppy tries to remove him from office Tad Hammond (Douglas Dumbrille) hires 40 gunslingers to stop him.

Once the outlaws have been stopped Deputy California Carson (Andy Clyde) runs for sheriff.

Cast
 William Boyd as Hopalong Cassidy
 Andy Clyde as Deputy California Carson
 Jimmy Rogers as Deputy Jimmy Rogers
 Douglas Dumbrille as Tad Hammond
 Louise Currie as Katherine Reynolds
 Kirk Alyn as Jerry Doyle
 Herbert Rawlinson as Buck Peters
 Robert Frazer as Judge Reynolds
 Glenn Strange as Ike Simmons
 Hal Taliaferro as Jess Clanton
 Jack Rockwell as Sam Garms
 Bob Kortman as Joe Garms

See also
 List of American films of 1944

References

External links
 
 
 
 

1944 films
1940s English-language films
1944 Western (genre) films
Republic Pictures films
American Western (genre) films
Hopalong Cassidy films
Films with screenplays by Michael Wilson (writer)
Films directed by Lesley Selander
American black-and-white films
1940s American films